Benny Faccone is a recording engineer, mixing engineer, and record producer known for his work with Ricky Martin, Santana, Luis Miguel, Maná and Marco Antonio Solís. He has won 5 Grammy Awards and 12 Latin Grammy Awards.

Biography
Faccone was born in Italy and was raised in Canada. He received a composition degree from the Berklee College of Music. After graduation, he began working in the recording industry in Montreal and later moved to Los Angeles in 1980, where he became engineer at A&M Records. While mixing for the band Menudo, Faccone met Draco Rosa, member of the Puerto Rican boy band and with whom he continued working for the next decades. In 1986, Faccone became a freelance engineer.

Faccone owns "The Cavern" studios in Thousand Oaks, California. He named the studio after The Cavern Club in Liverpool, where The Beatles played during their early career. He is also a professor at the California Lutheran University.

Selected discography

Awards and recognition

Grammy Awards
Faccone has been nominated for the following Grammy Awards:

Latin Grammy Awards 
Faccone has been nominated for the following Latin Grammy Awards:

References

External links

 

Living people
Grammy Award winners
Latin Grammy Award winners
American people of Canadian descent
Berklee College of Music alumni
Latin music record producers
Year of birth missing (living people)